Chorinea is a Neotropical metalmark butterfly genus.

Species
Listed alphabetically:
Chorinea amazon (Saunders, 1859) French Guiana , Brazil 
Chorinea batesii (Saunders, 1859) French Guiana, Brazil 
Chorinea bogota (Saunders, 1859) Guatemala, Colombia
Chorinea gratiosa Stichel, 1910 Ecuador
Chorinea heliconides (Swainson, [1833]) Brazil 
Chorinea licursis (Fabricius, 1775)
Chorinea octauius (Fabricius, 1787) – octauius swordtail
Chorinea sylphina (Bates, 1868) – sylphina angel

Pinned specimens

References

External links
 images representing Chorinea at Encyclopedia of Life
images representing Chorinea at Consortium for the Barcode of Life

Riodinini
Riodinidae of South America
Butterfly genera
Taxa named by John Edward Gray